Ronald E. Powaski (June 15, 1943 - November 2019) was an American historian and teacher. He taught American history in high schools and colleges in Ohio and wrote on the 20th century foreign policies of the United States and Europe.

Biography

Early life and education

Ronald Powaski graduated from Cathedral Latin High School in 1960. He earned Bachelor of Arts and Master of Arts degrees in history from John Carroll University in 1964 and 1966 and his PhD from Case Western Reserve University in Cleveland in 1972 with a dissertation entitled "Great Britain and the Manchurian crisis, 1931-1933".

Career 

Powaski taught history at Euclid Senior High School in Euclid, Ohio.
He also taught at Cleveland State University, John Carroll University, and Ashland University.

In 1989 he published March to Armageddon: The United States and the Nuclear Arms Race, 1939 to the Present. In the next two decades, he published 11 books covering the nuclear arms race, the creation of NATO, World War II, presidential statecraft, and presidential foreign policies.

Books

Commentaries
 
 Powaski, Ronald E. "Bush's Nuclear Folly." America 189, no. 3 (August 4, 2003): 7. Education Research Complete, EBSCOhost (accessed March 30, 2010).

References

External links 
 Ronald E. Powaski nndb.com

Contemporary historians
Historians of the United States
Cold War historians
Historians of World War II
American military historians
American male non-fiction writers
Cleveland State University faculty
Case Western Reserve University alumni
People from Euclid, Ohio
1943 births
2019 deaths
Historians from Ohio